Vrchlice is a stream in the Central Bohemian Region of the Czech Republic. It is the longest tributary of the Klejnárka River.

References

Rivers of the Czech Republic
Geography of the Central Bohemian Region